Events in the year 1958 in Portugal.

Incumbents
 President: Francisco Craveiro Lopes
 Prime Minister: António de Oliveira Salazar

Events
 8 June – Portuguese presidential election, 1958.
 TACV Cabo Verde Airlines  founded

Arts and entertainment

Sports
 1958 Portuguese Grand Prix
 AD Fafe founded
 G.D. Riopele founded
 Establishment of the Campeonato Português de Rugby.

Births

 29 June – Rosa Mota, runner.

Deaths
 3 March – Emílio Lino, fencer (born 1916).
 16 August – José Domingues dos Santos, politician, jurist, professor and journalist (born 1885)

References

 
1950s in Portugal
Portugal
Years of the 20th century in Portugal
Portugal